Robin Brown is a Canadian radio journalist. Best known as host of the series The Inside Track on CBC Radio One, she was more recently heard as a fill-in host on various programs for the network and its Toronto station CBLA. Brown is currently the producer of Windsor Morning, CBC Radio One's local morning program in Windsor.

She is the daughter of Harry Brown, a noted CBC Radio personality in the 1960s and 1970s. She is also a cousin of the morning show host at CBC Radio Thunder Bay, Lisa Laco.

References 

Canadian radio sportscasters
Living people
Year of birth missing (living people)
Canadian talk radio hosts
CBC Radio hosts
Canadian women radio journalists
Canadian women radio hosts